North Shippen–Tobacco Avenue Historic District is a historic cigar factory and tobacco warehouse complex and national historic district located at Lancaster, Lancaster County, Pennsylvania. It includes eight contributing buildings, four of which were previously listed as the A. B. Hess Cigar Factory, and Warehouses. They are the Consolidated Cigar Co. consisting of the M. Oppenheimer and J. Bunzl & Sons warehouses (c. 1880), J.R. Russel Tobacco Warehouse (c. 1880), and J. Best Tobacco Warehouse (c. 1880).  All four buildings are brick buildings over stone foundations used for the processing and storage of cigar leaf tobacco.

It was listed on the National Register of Historic Places in 1990.

References

Industrial buildings and structures on the National Register of Historic Places in Pennsylvania
Historic districts on the National Register of Historic Places in Pennsylvania
Buildings and structures in Lancaster, Pennsylvania
Historic districts in Lancaster County, Pennsylvania
Tobacco buildings in the United States
National Register of Historic Places in Lancaster, Pennsylvania